EBiDAN (abbreviation from ) is a music collective consisting of male artists associated with the talent agency Stardust Promotion.

Lineup

Music groups 
 Bullet Train
 DISH//
 
 M!LK
 SUPER★DRAGON
 Starmen KiDS
 AMEZARI -RED STARS-
 ZeBRA☆STAR
 EBiSSH (This unit merged with Satori Boys Club after touring together in 2018, forming the unit ONE N' ONLY.)
  
 ONE N' ONLY
 
 EDAMAME BEANS {エダマメビーンズ}

Former artists 
 
 MAGiC BOYZ
 PrizmaX

References

External links 
 
 Ebidan's official blog on Ameba
 

Japanese boy bands
Japanese pop music groups
Musical groups established in 2010
2010 establishments in Japan
Stardust Promotion artists